Mark Walter Harris (22 August 1947 – 15 January 2020) was an Australian professional rugby league footballer who played for the Eastern Suburbs (1970–79) and North Sydney (1980–81) clubs. He also represented the Montreal Alouettes in the Canadian Football League. A destructive hard running , Harris made 190 appearances for the Roosters and a further 33 for the Bears.

Playing career
A Brisbane junior, Harris was playing in Papua New Guinea for the Koni Tigers club when recruited into the NSWRFL Premiership by Sydney's Eastern Suburbs club. Harris also won the prestigious media award 'Rookie Of The Year' in his first season. He was selected to represent Australia in the 1970 Rugby League World Cup. In 1972 he won another prestigious award taking out the Sun-Herald player of the year award. He was also selected to represent Australia in the 1972 Rugby League World Cup. Harris played in just the one test match for Australia, that was against New Zealand in 1972.

Gridiron football career

Harris turned down a place on the 1973 Kangaroo tour of Great Britain and France to trial with an American football team, the Philadelphia Eagles. After failing to get a contract, Harris played Canadian football for the Montreal Alouettes in the Canadian Football League. Harris played 7 matches as a long range kickoff specialist during the 1973 CFL season.

Return to rugby league

Harris returned to the Roosters and was a member of some of Eastern Suburbs greatest teams, winning premierships with that club in 1974 and 1975. He was selected to represent Australia in the 1975 Rugby League World Cup. Harris was also a member of the 1974 and '77 pre-Season cup winning sides, the 1975 and '77 midweek cups. He was selected to represent Australia in the 1977 Rugby League World Cup.

Harris played out the final years of his career with the North Sydney club.

Post-playing career
Harris was a member of the National Rugby League judiciary in 2000. He died on 15 January 2020 from throat cancer at the age of 72.

References

External links

 

1947 births
2020 deaths
Australia national rugby league team players
Australian players of Canadian football
Australian rugby league players
Deaths from throat cancer
Montreal Alouettes players
North Sydney Bears players
Rugby league centres
Rugby league players from Brisbane
Sydney Roosters players
Deaths from cancer in Australia